Tritonia incerta is a species of dendronotid nudibranch. It is a marine gastropod mollusc in the family Tritoniidae.

Distribution
This species is known from New Zealand.

References

Tritoniidae
Gastropods described in 1904